Aldri mer 13! (13 Never Again!) is a Norwegian film from 1996, directed by Sirin Eide and starring Sofie Cappelen.

Plot summary
Seventh-grade Rikke is one of the most popular girls in her class, but one day arrives a new girl, Bea, who begins to take her place in the classroom. As the newcomer makes herself at home, an unhealthy competition develops between the two. A relationship that the two have to settle before they can be friends, and explore the future joys and sorrows of youth together.

Cast
 Sofie Stange Cappelen
 Martine Karlsen
 Anne Krigsvoll
 Svein Roger Karlsen

Reception
The film received a "die throw" of 6 (out of 6) in Romerikes Blad, 4 in Bergensavisen and Drammens Tidende,  as well as a favourable review in Nordlys and a mediocre review in Rogalands Avis.

References

External links
 

1996 films
Norwegian drama films
1990s Norwegian-language films